Herpystis esson is a species of moth of the family Tortricidae. It is found in New Caledonia, a special collectivity of France located in the southwest Pacific Ocean.

The wingspan is about 13 mm. The ground colour of the forewings is white, preserved from the dorsal third of the wing to before the tornus. The forewings are marked with brownish strigulae (fine streaks). The remaining area is grey and brownish, but the terminal area is brown. The hindwings are pale brownish, but paler and more cream towards the base.

Etymology
The species name refers to the size of the species and is derived from Greek esson (meaning weaker, smaller).

References

Moths described in 2013
Eucosmini